Katherine Jayne Secker (born 12 July 1972) is an English journalist and newsreader for Sky News. She has presented Sky News Today on the channel since September 2014, formerly alongside Colin Brazier.

Early life 
Secker was born in 1972 in Bedlington, Northumberland and grew up in North East England. Her mother was the Tyne Tees Television broadcaster Kathy Secker.

Following A levels at Westfield School, she undertook a degree course in film and media at the University of Stirling. During that time she edited student newspapers and completed an internship with BBC Radio Newcastle. After graduating, she became an assigned BBC trainee in 1996.

Career 
Secker joined Sky News in 2002. She spent 10 years as a foreign correspondent, frequently reporting from war zones including the Middle East.

In 2014, as part of a schedule change, Sky News Today was launched, presented by Secker and Colin Brazier.

She conducted the first live TV interview with the astronaut Tim Peake from the International Space Station.

Controversy 
In April 2019, Secker drew criticism for her comments during an interview about 'no-fault evictions'. Viewers accused her of being "patronising" and "insensitive" over her lines of questioning of the housing campaigner Kirsty Archer.

Personal life 
Secker has a brother, David. She is married to Dom and has two children; Jake and Seb.

Her mother Kathy died in 2015 aged 70. Secker founded the charity Grace House North East in her memory.

References

External links 
 
 Jayne Secker on Twitter

1972 births
Living people
People from Bedlington
Alumni of the University of Stirling
Sky News newsreaders and journalists
English women journalists
British women journalists
English television journalists
British television newsreaders and news presenters